The Alfred E. Dickey Free Library in Jamestown, North Dakota was built in 1917.  It was listed on the National Register of Historic Places in 1980.

According to its NRHP nomination, it is "a rare and fine example" of Prairie School architecture in North Dakota.

It seems to have been designed by Joseph A. Shannon and Henry J. Scherer.
According to its NRHP nomination, however, it was designed by architectural partners "J. H. Shannon" and Henry J. Scherer.
And according to a different NRHP nomination, from 1989, for the Devils Lake Commercial District, the Dickey Free Library was designed by 
"John A. Shannon", late in his career.  These appear to be misstatements of the name of local architect Joseph A. Shannon.

References

External links

Library buildings completed in 1917
Prairie School architecture in North Dakota
Buildings and structures in Jamestown, North Dakota
Libraries on the National Register of Historic Places in North Dakota
National Register of Historic Places in Stutsman County, North Dakota
1917 establishments in North Dakota
Public libraries in North Dakota